The Fiat CR.1 was an Italian biplane fighter aircraft of the 1920s. Of wood-and-fabric construction, it was designed by Celestino Rosatelli, from whom it gained the 'CR' designation. Its most distinctive feature was that the lower wings were longer than the upper ones.

Design and development

Regia Aeronautica requested two prototype aircraft from Fiat in the early 1920s. The results were designated MM.1 and MM.2, identical except for the rudder (one had a rounded, counterbalanced rudder) and engines (they had differing marks of Hispano-Suiza piston engines).

The aircraft was a biplane of conventional layout, with fixed tailskid landing gear and an open cockpit, with the pilot's head aligned with the trailing edge of the upper wing. The V8 engine powered a fixed-pitch two-blade wooden propeller. The landing gear had a fixed axle between the wheels. It carried two synchronized 7.7 mm (.303 in) Vickers machine guns firing through the propeller arc.

The two prototypes were evaluated against another biplane fighter, the SIAI S.52, and proved superior in manoeuvrability and top speed. Accordingly, contracts were issued to three Italian companies for three batches of production aircraft, to be designated CR.1:
109 units to be built by Fiat;
 40 units to be built by OFM of Napoli;
100 units to be built by SIAI.

After two preproduction prototypes were again flight tested, a total of 240 units were placed in Italian military service, beginning in 1925.

Operational history

The Regia Aeronautica ordered 240 CR.1s and began equipping its 1st Fighter
Group in 1924. By 1926, 12 Italian fighter squadrons had been allocated the aircraft. In the same year, Fiat introduced an updated all-metal version, the CR.20.

Though both Belgium and Poland evaluated and rejected the aircraft, an export order was received from Latvia. Their nine CR.1s, fitted with the 224 kW (300 hp) Hispano-Suiza HS8N8 engine, served in Latvian Naval Aviation until 1936.

In the 1930s, some CR.1s were fitted with Isotta Fraschini Asso Caccia engines of 328 kW (440 hp), which improved their performance. These units were given to 163 Squadriglia, based at Rhodes in the Aegean Sea. Those units were withdrawn from active service in 1937.

Variants

MM.1
Prototype.
MM.2
Prototype.
CR.1
Single-seat fighter biplane
CR.2
One evaluation model, equipped with an Armstrong Siddeley Lynx radial engine.
CR.5
One evaluation model, equipped with an Alfa Romeo Jupiter radial engine.
CR.10
One evaluation moded, equipped with a  Fiat A.20 water-cooled V-12 engine with two Lamblin radiators.
CR.10 Idro
The CR.10 converted to a floatplane.

Operators

Regia Aeronautica

Latvian Air Force
Latvian Navy

Specifications (CR.1)

See also

References

External links

 Fiat CR.1 (Spanish)

CR.01
Biplanes
Single-engined tractor aircraft
1920s Italian fighter aircraft